Dust on the Bible is an album recorded by Kitty Wells and released in 1959 on the Decca label (DL 8858). The Encyclopedia of American Gospel Music called it "a classic of country-style gospel."

Reception
Thom Owens of Allmusic called the album "a moving set of country gospel performed with affection and honesty."

The Rolling Stone Album Guide gave the album three stars and called it "a stirring collection of gospel numbers."

Track listing
Side A
 "Dust on the Bible" (Johnnie Bailes, Walter Bailes) - 2:17
 "I Dreamed I Searched Heaven for You" (James D. Vaughn, Mary Ethel Weiss) - 2:30
 "Lonesome Valley" (A. P. Carter) - 2:16
 "My Loved Ones Are Waiting for Me" (James D. Vaughn) - 2:04
 "I Heard My Savior Call" (Johnnie Bailes) - 2:03
 "The Great Speckled Bird" - 2:20

Side B
 "He Will Set Your Fields On Fire" (C.M. Ballew, Veona Braskett) - 2:20
 "We Buried Her Beneath the Willows" (Cumberland Ridge Runners) - 2:34
 "One-Way Ticket to the Sky" (Johnnie Bailes, Walter Bailes) - 2:32
 "I Need the Prayers" (James D. Vaughn) - 2:26
 "Matthew Twenty-Four" (Lonnie Glosson) - 2:00
 "Lord I'm Coming Home" (William J. Kirkpatrick) - 2:15

See also
 Kitty Wells albums discography

References

1959 albums
Kitty Wells albums
Decca Records albums